Victor, duc de Broglie may refer to:

Victor François, Duc de Broglie (1718-1804)
Achille Léonce Victor Charles, duc de Broglie (1785-1870)